Alpha was a monthly men's magazine published in Australia between 2005 and 2011. At one point it was the "biggest-selling men's magazine in Australian publishing history".

History and profile
Alpha was published by News Magazines and was established in 2005. The parent company was News Corporation. The magazine was published on a monthly basis and covered articles about men's lifestyle and sports. In 2008 the magazine was redesigned. It reached a peak circulation of 113,000 in 2009, but this had fallen to 65,000 when the magazine was closed in 2011.

References

2005 establishments in Australia
2011 disestablishments in Australia
Defunct magazines published in Australia
Magazines established in 2005
Magazines disestablished in 2011
Men's magazines published in Australia
Monthly magazines published in Australia
News Corp Australia